Eric Thompson (6 October 1938 – 4 September 1992) was a Scottish cricketer. He played in sixteen first-class matches between 1965 and 1974. He was one of only two cricketers to represent Scotland who were born on the Orkney Islands. In May 2019, he was inducted into Cricket Scotland's Hall of Fame.

References

External links
 

1938 births
1992 deaths
Scottish cricketers
Place of birth missing